Rudby is a village and civil parish,  from the market town of Stokesley in the Hambleton District of North Yorkshire, England.

Geography
It is adjoined to another village called Hutton Rudby and it lies on the River Leven.

Governance
An electoral ward in the same name exists. This ward stretches east to Appleton Wiske and has a total population taken at the 2011 Census of 3,521.

Gallery

References

External links

Villages in North Yorkshire
Civil parishes in North Yorkshire